Petrit is an Albanian masculine given name and may refer to:
Petrit Çeku (born 1985), Kosovar classical guitarist
Petrit Dibra (born 1953), Albanian footballer
Petrit Dume (1920–1975), Albanian general and politician
Petrit Frrokaj (born 1985), Swiss footballer 
Petrit Hoxhaj (born 1990), Kosovar-Dutch footballer
Petrit Selimi (born 1979), Kosovar politician
Petrit Vasili (born 19??), Albanian politician
Petrit Zhubi (born 1988). Swedish footballer 

Albanian masculine given names